Hinduism is the largest religion in Kerala and Hindu lineages together make up 54.8% of the population of the state according to the 2011 census.

Background 
Hinduism is the most widely professed faith in Kerala. According to 2011 Census of India figures, 54.7% of Kerala's residents are Hindus. Hindus represent the biggest religious group in all districts except Malappuram. 

The mythological legends regarding the origin of Kerala are Hindu in nature. Kerala produced several saints and movements. Adi Shankara was a religious philosopher who contributed to Hinduism and propagated the philosophy of Advaita. He was instrumental in establishing four mathas at Sringeri, Dwarka, Puri and Jyotirmath. Melpathur Narayana Bhattathiri was another religious figure who composed Narayaniyam, a collection of verses in praise of the Hindu God Krishna.

Various practises of Hinduism are unique to Kerala. Different cults of Shiva and Vishnu are popular in Kerala. Lord Krishna is worshipped widely in all parts of Kerala, Guruvayur being one of the most famous temples in the state. Malayali Hindus also worship Bhagavathi as a form of Shakti. Almost every village in Kerala has its own local guardian deity, usually a goddess. Hindus in Kerala also strongly believe in power of snake gods and usually have sacred snake groves known as Sarpa Kavu near to their houses.

Malayali Hindus have ceremonies such as Chorunu (first feeding of rice to a child) and Vidyāraṃbhaṃ.

Demographics

Hindu population by district

Historical growth

Hindu temples 

Some of the most notable temples are: 

 Ananthapura Lake Temple 
 Angadipuram 
 Thirumandhamkunnu Temple 
 Alathiyoor Hanuman Temple 
 Bhayankavu Bhagavathi Temple 
 Kadampuzha Devi Temple 
 Keraladeshpuram Temple 
 Panniyur Sri Varahamurthy Temple 
 Sukapuram Dakshinamoorthy Temple 
 Thirunavaya Navamukunda Temple 
 Triprangode Siva Temple 
 Tali Shiva Temple 
 Trikkandiyur Siva Temple 
 Thrissur Vadakkunnathan Temple 
 Guruvayur Temple 
 Lokanarkavu Temple 
 Thirunelli Temple 
 Sabarimala Ayyappa Temple 
 Thiruvananthapuram Padmanabhaswamy Temple 
 Aranmula Parthasarathy Temple 
 Chottanikkara Temple 
 Chengannur Mahadeva Temple 
 Parassinikadavu Muthappan Temple 
 Chettikulangara Devi Temple 
 Mannarasala Temple 
 Chakkulathukavu Temple 
 Thiruvalla Sreevallabha Temple 
 Kaviyoor Mahadevar Temple 
 Parumala Panayannarkavu Temple 
 Sree Poornathrayesa Temple 
 Kodungallur Bhagavathy Temple 
 Attukal Temple 
 Trikkur Mahadeva Temple 
 Rajarajeshwara Temple

Saints
Adi Shankara, the originator of Advaita Vedanta, was born in Kalady and was likely a Nambuthiri. Many Hindu saints and swamis from many castes have lived in Kerala. Sree Narayana Guru, Enadinatha, Ilakkulaccanrar, Tiruppana were all outside the Brahminical caste fold; Cheraman Nayanar was a Kothayar; and Chattampi Swamikal, Swami Sathyananda Saraswathi and Swami Chinmayananda, the Nair caste. The Parayas of Kerala claim descent from Vasishtha. There is a shrine in Kollengode in memory of a lower-caste saint, Paakkanar. The theatrical dance of Rapayan Tullal is narrated by a descendant of Pakkanar. The Periya Puranam, possibly written by a Paraya, describes the Parayas.

Swami Sathyananda Saraswathi is popularly regarded as the father of contemporary Hindu renaissance in Kerala for the victorious movements he led for temple rights and the establishment of Hindu Aikya Vedi for integrating people of all castes into one religion. He is reckoned as the greatest karmayogi to uphold Sanatana Dharma since Swami Vivekananda internationally. Sree Narayana Jayanti (Narayana Guru's birthday) and Sree Narayana Samadhi Day (the occasion of his samadhi) are public holidays in Kerala.

Mata Amritanandamayi, known among her devotees as Amma, was selected to represent the Hindu Dharma in the World Parliament of Religions in September 1991. Bhagawan Nityananda was another important Hindu saint widely recognized.

Several Hindu movements important to Hindu history took place in Kerala. The Karppillikkavu Sree Mahadeva Temple, (one of the most ancient in India) dedicated to the Kirata Avatar of Lord Shiva still exists in Kerala.

See also

Demographics of Kerala
Hinduism in India

References

External links